Vincent William Woodcock (born 11 September 1987) is a retired Seychellois athlete who specialised in the high jump. He represented his country at the 2007 World Championships without clearing his opening height in the qualification round.

His personal bests in the event are 2.20 metres outdoors (New Delhi 2010) and 2.18 metres indoors (Karlsruhe 2007). Both are current national records.

International competitions

References

1987 births
Living people
Seychellois male high jumpers
Athletes (track and field) at the 2010 Commonwealth Games
Commonwealth Games competitors for Seychelles
Athletes (track and field) at the 2011 All-Africa Games
African Games medalists in athletics (track and field)
African Games bronze medalists for Seychelles